Aashim Gulati (born 15 September 1990) is an Indian actor. He is known for his portrayal of Neel Gujral in Gulmohar Grand, Rehaan Khanna in Dil Sambhal Jaa Zara and Karna in Karn Sangini.

Career
Gulati made his television debut in 2015 with Gulmohar Grand. In 2016, he made his film debut as Amar in Tum Bin II opposite Neha Sharma. In the same year, he played Ayush in Yeh Hai Aashiqui. In 2017, Gulati played Rehaan in Star Plus's Dil Sambhal Jaa Zara opposite Smiriti Kalra. The following year, he portrayed Karn in Star Plus's Karn Sangini opposite Tejasswi Prakash.

Filmography

Films

Television

Web series

Music videos

References

External links

 

Living people
21st-century Indian male actors
Indian male film actors
Indian male models
Male actors in Hindi television
Male actors in Hindi cinema
Male actors from Delhi
People from Delhi
Mayo College alumni
1990 births